Grahamstown (officially known as Makhanda) is a town of about 140,000 people in the Eastern Cape province of South Africa. It is the largest town in the Makana Local Municipality, and the seat of the municipal council. It also hosts Rhodes University, the Eastern Cape Division of the High Court, the South African Library for the Blind (SALB), a diocese of the Anglican Church of Southern Africa, and 6 South African Infantry Battalion. Furthermore, located approximately 3 km south-east of the town lies the world renowned Waterloo Farm, the only estuarine fossil site in the world from 360 million years ago with exceptional soft-tissue preservation.

The town's name-change from Grahamstown to Makhanda was officially gazetted on 29 June 2018. The town was officially renamed to Makhanda in memory of Xhosa warrior and prophet Makhanda ka Nxele.

History

Founding

Grahamstown was founded in 1812 after the Fourth Xhosa War as a military outpost by Lieutenant-Colonel John Graham as part of a campaign to secure the Eastern frontier of the Cape Colony. Initially Colonel Graham decided to establish his headquarters on the loan farm Noutoe, now known as Table Farm, but at the recommendation of Ensign Andries Stockenstrom it was moved to the homestead of the loan farm De Rietfontein, belonging to Lucas Meyer. Construction on the new headquarters, located on the site of the present Church Square, thus began in June 1812.

As part of the campaign, Graham was ordered to clear 20,000 Xhosa living in the region led by Ndlambe ka Rharhabe from the Zuurveld. During the campaign, which formed part of the Xhosa Wars, Graham ordered the adoption of numerous scorched earth tactics, which included the burnings of Xhosa farms. By 1812, Graham had completed his assignment, and transformed Grahamstown into the central military outpost in the region.

Battle of Grahamstown

On 22 April 1819, a large number of Xhosa warriors, under the leadership of Nxele (or the Xhosa prophet Makhanda), launched an attack against the British garrison stationed at Grahamstown. The Xhosas had warned Colonel Willshire, the commanding officer, of their planned attack on the settlement. It was one of countless attacks launched on the nascent colony by the Xhosas. During the course of the battle, the British were running low on ammunition. The Xhosas, with a force of 10,000 troops under the overall command of Ndlambe's warrior son, Mdushane, were unable to overpower the garrison of some 300 men. Nxele surrendered and was taken captive and imprisoned on Robben Island. On Christmas Day in 1819, he tried to escape but drowned in the attempt.

Growth
Grahamstown grew during the 1820s, as many 1820 Settlers and their families left farming to establish themselves in more secure trades. In 1833, Grahamstown was described as having "two or three English merchants of considerable wealth, but scarcely any society in the ordinary sense of the word. The Public Library is a wretched affair". As of 1833, it was estimated that the population of Grahamstown was approximately 6,000. In a few decades it became the Cape Colony's largest town after Cape Town. It became a bishopric in 1852. It was traditionally the capital and cultural centre of the Albany area, a district that was traditionally English-speaking and had a distinctive local culture.

In 1872, the Cape Government Railways began construction of the railway line linking Grahamstown to Port Alfred on the coast and to the developing national railway network inland. It was completed and opened on 3 September 1879.

Grahamstown grew rapidly to become the second-largest city in South Africa after Cape Town until 1930. The early 1860s saw the development of more schools, the botanical gardens, and the Eastern District Supreme Court was established. In 1864, a full parliamentary session was held in Grahamstown, instead of Cape Town. There was talk of making Grahamstown the capital of the Cape Colony because of its central position. Grahamstown was the location of the testing of the first diamond find by Henry Carter Galpin.

In 1904, Rhodes University College was established in Grahamstown through a grant from the Rhodes Trust. In 1951 it became a fully-fledged University, Rhodes University.

Name change 
The name "Grahamstown" originated from the Cape Hottentot Corps in the Zuurveld's Commander of the Regiment, Colonel John Graham, who, in June 1812, oversaw the construction on the corps' new headquarters, located on the site of the present Church Square. Grahamstown went on to become a religious, military, administrative, judicial, and educational centre for the surrounding region of  Albany.

Arts and Culture Minister Nathi Mthethwa announced the name change from Grahamstown in the Government Gazette No. 641 of 29 June 2018. The purpose of gazetting was to publicise the minister's decision for objections or comments by 28 July 2018.

Prompted by a Truth and Reconciliation Commission recommendation that geographic features, including geographical names, be renamed as a "symbolic reparation to address an unjust past", a proposal was for the town to be renamed after Makhanda, in recognition of his failed attack against the settlement's garrison in 1819. On 2 October 2018, Grahamstown was officially renamed Makhanda in the memory of Makhanda.

Religion

St. Michael and St. George Cathedral is the seat of the Anglican Diocese of Grahamstown. The town also has Roman Catholic, Presbyterian, Ethiopian Episcopal, Methodist, Baptist, Pinkster Protestante, Dutch Reformed (Nederduits Gereformeerde Kerk), Charismatic, Apostolic and Pentecostal churches. There are also meeting places for Hindus, Scientologists, Quakers, The Church of Jesus Christ of Latter-day Saints and Muslims.

The city is home to more than forty religious buildings and is nicknamed the "City of Saints". According to one story recorded by H. V. Morton, The town earned its nickname from Royal Engineers stationed in Grahamstown in 1846 who were in need of building tools. They sent a message to Cape Town requesting a vice to be forwarded to them from the Ordnance Stores. A reply came back, 'Buy vice locally'. The response was, "No vice in Grahamstown".

Demographics
According to the 2011 census the population of the town was 67,264, of whom 78.9% described themselves as "Black African", 11.3% as "Coloured" and 8.4% as "White". Since 1994, there has been a considerable influx of black people from the former Ciskei Xhosa homeland, which lies just to the east. The first language of 72.2% of the population is Xhosa, while 13.7% speak Afrikaans and 10.8% speak English.

Education, arts and culture
The town is home to Rhodes University, the South African National Library for the Blind, the National English Literary Museum, the South African Institute for Aquatic Biodiversity (formerly the JLB Smith Institute), the International Library of African Music (ILAM), the Albany Museum, and the Institute for the Study of English in Africa. A number of palaeontological discoveries made from Waterloo Farm in the past two decades have sparked a global interest in the fossils of the Eastern Cape Province and this has resulted in numerous international collaborations. These discoveries and collaborations have been made possible by the persistent work of Dr Robert W. Gess of the Devonian Ecosystem Laboratory, Albany Museum, who has dedicated most of his life excavating and studying blocks of black shale that he, with later support from the South African Roads Agency Limited (SANRAL) has rescued from road cuttings from back in the mid- 1980s.

The legacy of disparate education during Apartheid still echoes in the provision of secondary education in this former frontier town, where significant discrepancies in matric pass rates and general quality of education exist. Addressing this problem is one of the town's greatest challenges.

In March 1984, the City of Grahamstown adopted a flag, one of six designs prepared by heraldic expert Prof. Hugh Smith, of Rhodes University.

Clock towers in the town
The following is a list of tower clocks in the town, with their location and if they are in working order:

St Michael and St George Cathedral, in working order, 
City Hall, not in working order, 
 Rhodes University, not in working order, 
 High Court, not in working order, 
 Dutch Reformed Church, in working order, 
 Observatory Museum, not in working order, 
 St. Andrew's College, in working order, 
 Kingswood College chapel, in working order,

Festivals
Two large festivals take place annually in the town: the National Arts Festival in June/July and SciFest Africa in the first term of the year and attracts some 50,000 people. The National Arts Festival is the largest Arts festival in Africa and sees some of the leading talent on the South African and international art scene arriving in the town for a celebration of culture and artistic expression. South Africa's National Science Festival, was established in 1996 to promote the public awareness, understanding and appreciation of science, technology, engineering, mathematics and innovation. The town is also host to the Puku Story Festival since 2013 presented by the Puku Children's Literature Foundation. The festival was created in partnership with the National Arts Festival and the African Studies Department at Rhodes University with the aim to facilitate access to literature and educational/recreational materials in Xhosa.

Schools

Press

The town is home to the oldest surviving independent newspaper in South Africa. Grocott's Mail was founded in 1870 by the Grocott family, and bought out a newspaper called the Grahamstown Journal, which was founded in 1831. Robert Godlonton, a previous owner of the Journal had used it and his other papers to oppose Andries Stockenström's treaty system and advocated seizing more land from the Xhosa. It is now a local newspaper operated by the Rhodes University School of Journalism and Media Studies, and still retains its name.

As a major centre for journalism training, Rhodes University also hosts two student newspapers, Activate, established in 1947, and The Oppidan Press, a student initiative launched in 2007 that caters mainly to the student population living off-campus.

Government
With the establishment of the Union of South Africa the Grahamstown High Court became a Local Division of the newly formed Supreme Court of South Africa (under Cape Town). On 28 June 1957, the Eastern Districts Court, under the name Eastern Cape Division, became a provincial division. In certain other areas of provincial government Grahamstown similarly served as a centre for the Eastern Cape.

In 1994, Grahamstown became part of the newly established Eastern Cape Province, while Bhisho was chosen as the provincial capital.

It is the seat of the Eastern Cape Division of the High Court, as well as the Magistrate's Court for the Albany District. As a result of the presence of a High Court, several other related organs of state such as a Masters Office and a Director of Public Prosecutions are present in the town.
A few other Government (mostly provincial) departments maintain branches or other offices in the town.

Grahamstown was the only settlement outside Cape Town to host a sitting of the Cape Colony legislature (a move to defuse a call for the creation of a separate colony).

Municipal government
Grahamstown had its own municipality until 2000. Since then, it has expanded into the Makana Local Municipality in the Cacadu District.

From 2012, the Makana Local Municipality was unable to reliably provide water to its citizens. The crisis continued to grow during 2013.

In 2013, South Africa's minister of water Edna Molewa was tasked with restoring the water supply of Grahamstown following protests over a nine-day water outage. Causes for the outage include financial mismanagement, with under-spending on infrastructure. The task force established by Molewa had not solved the problem by 2014. A 2021 auditor-general's report found that the municipality’s liabilities exceeded its assets by R813 million (equivalent to US$ 54.2 million) and that it has failed to keep full and proper records. By 2022 senior management was the subject of a criminal investigation and provincial government had to make quarterly reports to the Supreme Court of Appeal on the municipality's financial recovery.

Social issues
In October 2015, more than 500 people were displaced and more than 300 shops looted during a wave of xenophobic violence.

Some people use traditional African medicine because it is believed to be effective. There are some plants which are popular with the indigenous people of the area.

Coat of arms

Municipality (1) — The first arms were assumed in September 1862. They quartered an incorrect version of the arms of Graham of Fintry with those of Jan van Riebeeck (in incorrect colours), with an ostrich as a crest. The supporters were a leopard and a giraffe, and the motto was Virtute et opera.

Municipality (2) — In response to a call by the Cape Provincial Administration for municipalities to have their coats of arms checked and, if necessary, re-designed, the city council had a new coat of arms designed by Ivan Mitford-Barberton and H. Ellis Tomlinson in 1950. It was granted by the College of Arms on 20 July 1950, and registered at the Bureau of Heraldry in September 1994.

The new arms were : Or, on a pile Gules, three annulets placed 2 and 1 Or; on a chief Sable, three escallops Or (in layman's terms : a golden shield displaying, from top to bottom, three golden scallop shells on a black horizontal stripe, and three golden rings on a red triangle). The crest was changed to a plume of ostrich feathers issuing from a golden mural crown, and the supporters were differenced by placing an escallop on each shoulder.

Social movements
In 2017, Makana Revive! an independent civil society organisation was formed. During the first quarter of 2018, Makana Revive made national news when it spearheaded an initiative to repair failing infrastructure and improve the security and hygiene in the CBD. Donations were received from both local and international citizens and alumni.

The South African Unemployed Peoples' Movement has a strong presence in Makhanda.

Notable people
 Robert Armitage – cricketer
 William Guybon Atherstone – medical doctor, naturalist, geologist, and member of the Cape Parliament.
 H. K. Ayliff – British theatre director
 Andre Brink – novelist and Rhodes University professor
 Allister Coetzee - South African Rugby Head Coach
 John 'Jack' Biddulph Dold – Union rugby player and international cricketer
 Elize du Toit – British actress
 Kingsley Fairbridge – Founder of Fairbridge Schools
 Ernest Edward Galpin – Botanist and banker
 Robert Godlonton - politician, author, owner of Grahamstown Journal
 James Henry Greathead – Engineer renowned for his work on the London Underground railway
 Nigel Harris – British actor
 Sir James Rose Innes – second Chief Justice of South Africa
 AJ Kerr – Legal academic
 Johan Klopper - Cricketer
 Robert Jeremy Mansfield – Radio host, television presenter and comedian
 Patrick Moran - Catholic Bishop
 Lex Mpati - Judge, Retired President of the Supreme Court of Appeal and Chancellor of Rhodes University.
 Charles Mullins – Victoria Cross recipient
 Norman Ogilvie Norton – Cricketer (allrounder)
 Mike Pentz – Physicist, born and educated in Grahamstown before moving to the United Kingdom
 Alfred Renfrew Richards – Cricketer and rugby union player
 George Rowe, Cricketer
 Basil Schonland – Physicist, was born and educated in Grahamstown 
 Selmar Schonland – Botanist
 Ian Smith – Prime Minister of Rhodesia, student at Rhodes University
 Josie Wood – Founder, South African National Library for the Blind

See also

 Makana Local Municipality
 Albany, South Africa
 1820 Settlers

Major organisations
 Diocese of Grahamstown 
 Grocott's Mail
 International Library of African Music
 National Arts Festival
 National English Literary Museum
 Rhodes University
 South African Institute for Aquatic Biodiversity
 South African Library for the Blind

Notes and references

External links

 
 Historical pictures of Grahamstown
 SA Government Information
 National Arts Festival
 Scifest Africa

 
Cities in South Africa
Populated places in the Makana Local Municipality
Populated places established in 1812
1820 establishments in the Cape Colony